Drepanosticta subtropica (blue-shouldered cornuted shadowdamsel) is a species of damselfly in the family Platystictidae. It is endemic to Sri Lanka. The species was recorded for the first time after 83 years, along with three new species from Samanala Nature Reserve.

See also
 List of odonates of Sri Lanka

References

External links
 Asian Odonates
 Animal diversity web
 Sri Lanka Endemics

Damselflies of Sri Lanka
Insects described in 1933